Onthophagus is a genus of dung beetles in the Onthophagini tribe of the wider scarab beetle family, Scarabaeidae. It is the most species-rich and widespread genus in the subfamily Scarabaeinae (the 'true' dung beetles), with a global distribution.

Etymology

Taxonomy

This genus includes more than 20 subgenera and over 2,100 species. Some of the subgenera (including Proagoderus, Diastellopalpus, Digitonthophagus, Strandius, and Euonthophagus) are now widely recognized as genera.

Selected species

 Onthophagus (Amphionthophagus) melitaeus (Fabricius, 1798)
 Onthophagus (Furconthophagus) furcatus (Fabricius, 1781)
 Onthophagus (Onthophagus) illyricus (Scopoli, 1763)
 Onthophagus (Onthophagus) taurus (Schreber, 1759)
 Onthophagus (Onthophagus) binodis (Thunberg, 1818)
 Onthophagus (Palaeonthophagus) albarracinus (Baraud, 1979)
 Onthophagus (Palaeonthophagus) angorensis (Petrovitz, 1963)
 Onthophagus (Palaeonthophagus) baraudi (Nicolas, 1964)
 Onthophagus (Palaeonthophagus) coenobita (Herbst, 1783)
 Onthophagus (Palaeonthophagus) cruciatus (Ménetriés, 1832)
 Onthophagus (Palaeonthophagus) dellacasai (Pittino & Mariani, 1981)
 Onthophagus (Palaeonthophagus) excisus (Reiche & Saulcy, 1856)
 Onthophagus (Palaeonthophagus) fissicornis (Steven, 1809)
 Onthophagus (Palaeonthophagus) fracticornis (Preyssler, 1790)
 Onthophagus (Palaeonthophagus) gazella (Fabricius, 1787)
 Onthophagus (Palaeonthophagus) gibbulus (Pallas, 1781)
 Onthophagus (Palaeonthophagus) grossepunctatus (Reitter, 1905)
 Onthophagus (Palaeonthophagus) joannae (Goljan, 1953)
 Onthophagus (Palaeonthophagus) kindermanni (Harold, 1877)
 Onthophagus (Palaeonthophagus) kolenatii (Reitter, 1893)
 Onthophagus (Palaeonthophagus) latigena (d'Orbigni, 1897)
 Onthophagus (Palaeonthophagus) lemur (Fabricius, 1781)
 Onthophagus (Palaeonthophagus) leucostigma (Steven, 1811)
 Onthophagus (Palaeonthophagus) lucidus (Sturm, 1800)
 Onthophagus (Palaeonthophagus) macedonicus (Miksic, 1959)
 Onthophagus (Palaeonthophagus) marginalis (Gebler, 1817)
 Onthophagus (Palaeonthophagus) marginalis andalusicus (Waltl, 1835)
 Onthophagus (Palaeonthophagus) marginalis marginalis (Gebler, 1817)
 Onthophagus (Palaeonthophagus) massai (Baraud, 1975)
 Onthophagus (Palaeonthophagus) merdarius (Chevrolat, 1865)
 Onthophagus (Palaeonthophagus) nuchicornis (Linnaeus, 1758)
 Onthophagus (Palaeonthophagus) opacicollis (Reitter, 1893)
 Onthophagus (Palaeonthophagus) ovatus (Linnaeus, 1767)
 Onthophagus (Palaeonthophagus) panici (Petrovitz, 1964)
 Onthophagus (Palaeonthophagus) ponticus (Harold, 1883)
 Onthophagus (Palaeonthophagus) ruficapillus (Brullé, 1832)
 Onthophagus (Palaeonthophagus) semicornis (Panzer, 1798)
 Onthophagus (Palaeonthophagus) sericatus (Reitter, 1893)
 Onthophagus (Palaeonthophagus) similis (Scriba, 1790)
 Onthophagus (Palaeonthophagus) stylocerus (Graëlls, 1851)
 Onthophagus (Palaeonthophagus) suturellus (Brullé, 1832)
 Onthophagus (Palaeonthophagus) tesquorum (Semenov-Tian-Shanskii & Medvedev, 1927)
 Onthophagus (Palaeonthophagus) trigibber (Reitter, 1893)
 Onthophagus (Palaeonthophagus) vacca (Linnaeus, 1767)
 Onthophagus (Palaeonthophagus) verticicornis (Laicharting, 1781)
 Onthophagus (Palaeonthophagus) vitulus (Fabricius, 1776)
 Onthophagus (Relictonthophagus) emarginatus (Mulsant & Godart, 1842)
 Onthophagus (Relictonthophagus) nigellus (Illiger, 1803)
 Onthophagus (Relictonthophagus) punctatus (Illiger, 1803)
 Onthophagus (Trichonthophagus) hirtus (Illiger, 1803)
 Onthophagus (Trichonthophagus) maki (Illiger, 1803)

Gallery

See also
 List of Onthophagus species [Kharel et al 2020]

References
7. Kharel BP, Schoolmeester P, Sarkar SK (2020) A first faunistic account on the Onthophagus Latreille, 1802 (Coleoptera, Scarabaeidae, Scarabaeinae) of the Nadia district, West Bengal, with a preliminary checklist from India. Check List 16(2): 361-381. https://doi.org/10.15560/16.2.361

External links

 
 
 

Scarabaeinae
Scarabaeidae genera
Taxa named by Pierre André Latreille